Skating with the Stars is an American reality competition series that aired on ABC from November 22 to December 21, 2010. A spin-off of Dancing with the Stars hosted by British television personality Vernon Kay,  it featured celebrities paired with professionals from the world of figure skating.

The show had a schedule similar to the first season of Dancing with the Stars with performance shows on Monday nights. On week 2, the pair with the lowest combined judges points and viewer votes was eliminated at the end of the show. All six episodes of the show were broadcast. Johnny Weir, Dick Button, and Laurieann Gibson served as judges, while Tanith Belbin served as color commentator.

Couples
The 6 celebrities and professional ice skaters were:

Scoring chart

 indicate the lowest score for each week.
 indicate the highest score for each week.
 indicates the couple eliminated that week.
 indicates the returning couple that was in the bottom two.
 indicates the returning couple that was the last to be called safe.
 indicates that a couple withdrew from the competition.
 indicates the winning couple.
 indicates the runner-up couple.
 indicates the third-place couple.

Weekly scores
Unless indicated otherwise, individual judges scores in the chart below (given in parentheses) are listed in this order from left to right: Laurieann Gibson,  Johnny Weir, Dick Button.

Week 1 

Running order

Week 2 

Running order

Week 3 

Running order

*Brandon was unable to perform his routine due to breathing problems, so his scores were based on a taped recording of him and Keauna's dress rehearsal footage.

Week 4 
Running order

*Brandon and Keauna withdrew before the live performances, which caused them not to be able to perform live.

Week 5

Running order (Night 1)

Running order (Night 2)

Required element schedule
Each week, the celebrities and professional partners need to perform specific "Required Elements" in their routines.

 Week 1: The One Foot Assisted Glide & The Pair Spin
 Week 2: Tango or Swing, Tricky Footwork and Lifts
 Week 3: Jumps and Love Story
 Week 4: Thrill Week: The Death Spiral, The Throw, The Overhead Lift
 Week 5 Night One : Group Skate & Freeskate
 Week 5 Night Two : Favorite Skate of the Season

Ratings

See also 

 Skating with Celebrities, a similar series aired by Fox in 2006, adapted from ITV's Dancing on Ice format.

References

External links
Official Website (via Internet Archived)

2010s American reality television series
2010 American television series debuts
2010 American television series endings
American Broadcasting Company original programming
Figure skating reality television series